Salcayoc (possibly from Quechua sallqa wild, -yuq a suffix) is a  mountain in the Urubamba mountain range in the Andes of Peru. It is located in the Cusco Region, Urubamba Province, Ollantaytambo District.

References

Mountains of Peru
Mountains of Cusco Region